is a Japanese female tennis player.

She has career-high WTA rankings of 226 in singles, achieved in April 2019, and 136 in doubles, set in November 2018. Up to date, she has won two singles and 14 doubles titles on the ITF Circuit.

Kobori made her WTA Tour main-draw debut at the 2017 Japan Women's Open, after she received a wildcard alongside Erina Hayashi into the doubles tournament.

ITF Circuit finals

Singles: 6 (2 titles, 4 runner–ups)

Doubles: 31 (14 titles, 17 runner–ups)

References

External links
 
 

1998 births
Living people
Japanese female tennis players
Sportspeople from Saitama (city)
20th-century Japanese women
21st-century Japanese women